Nickerson Mountain is a mountain located in Carroll County, New Hampshire, in the northeastern Ossipee Mountains.  The peak was also once known as Mount Whittier; however, the USGS has since labelled a mountain to the immediate west with the name.

The Mount Whittier Ski Area and scenic gondola operated on Nickerson Mountain until 1985.

See also

 List of mountains in New Hampshire

External links

Nickerson
Nickerson